NOAC may refer to:

 National Order of the Arrow Conference, a Boy Scouts of America National Honor Society event
 Negros Occidental Agricultural College
 NOAC (integrated circuit) (NES-on-a-chip) in Nintendo clones
 Novel oral anticoagulants, blood-thinning medication